Inmaculada Castañón is a Spanish former international football midfielder who played for Karbo Deportivo and Spanish national team.

Career

She was always an amateur and she had to retire from football when she was thirty due to injury and the pressure of playing. She turned down generous offers to play in Portugal or France but she gave her family priority.

Honours

Club
Karbo
 Copa de la Reina (3): 1983, 1984, 1985
 Copa de la Reina (unofficial editions) (2): 1981, 1982
 Copa Galicia (1): 1987
 Galician League (5): 1983, 1984, 1985, 1986, 1987

References

1959 births
Spain women's international footballers
Footballers from Galicia (Spain)
Primera División (women) players
Women's association football midfielders
Spanish women's footballers